Archbishop Molloy High School (also called Molloy, Archbishop Molloy, or AMHS) is a co-educational, college preparatory, Catholic school for grades 9-12, located on  on 83-53 Manton Street, Briarwood, Queens, New York. It is part of the Roman Catholic Diocese of Brooklyn .

Molloy has an endowment of about $6 million (as of November 2010). The school's current principal is Darius Penikas, who started his term in 2015. Molloy's motto is "Non Scholae Sed Vitae," which is Latin for "Not For School, But For Life".

History
The school is staffed by the Marist Brothers, founded by Saint Marcellin Champagnat.

In 1892, Br. Zephiriny opened St. Ann's Academy in two brownstone buildings at East 76 Street and Lexington Avenue. Initially a parish elementary school, the program soon expanded to include a two-year commercial course and then a full four-year high school program. Initially conducted entirely in French, the school gradually moved to English-language instruction, and by the start of the 20th century, the Brothers anglicized the name to St. Ann's. During the Theodore Roosevelt era, the school briefly took on a military air, with uniforms and a marching band. Boarding facilities were added, and the growth of the school began. When the original parish church was replaced in 1912 with the present-day church, the Brothers acquired the old building and converted it as a gymnasium. A purpose-built five-story school building was then constructed, and other neighboring buildings were acquired.

65 years after its foundation, the school enrollment had increased to 800 in grades one through twelve, and all available buildings were full. Moreover, some of the earliest buildings had deteriorated structurally, and required replacement.

Archbishop Thomas Edmund Molloy, the Ordinary of the Diocese of Brooklyn, offered the Marist Brothers a  site he had purchased in central Queens County. In 1957, the Brothers moved to the new site, naming the building in honor of Archbishop Molloy. The building itself received an award from the Queens Chamber of Commerce's annual architectural competition in 1957. The expanded facilities enabled the school to nearly double its enrollment, meeting the urgent needs of the post–World War II baby boom generation. Despite the move, many of the hallowed St. Ann's traditions continued as the faculty and students moved en masse to the new site. Today, students are still known as Stanners (St. Anner's), and the school newspaper is the Stanner.

In 1987, the Ralph DiChiaro Center for Arts and Sciences was dedicated, giving the school new state-of-the-art facilities, including a theater, computer labs and a biology lab.

In 2000, Molloy became co-educational and opened the doors to women for the first time. It graduated its first female in 2004.

Richard Karsten, class of 1981, was appointed President of Molloy in July 2010. He served on the school's first director in the 1990s and is a member of the Stanner Hall of Fame.

Stanner

"Stanner" is a word created by Archbishop Molloy High School. Before modern-day Molloy was built in Briarwood, Queens, the school was named St. Ann's Academy. The students were known as "St. Ann-ers," a nickname which, over time, simply became "Stanners."  All of Molloy's students, current and alumni, are known as Stanners.

Several things in the school have this name, including the school newspaper, The Stanner. The school's athletic teams are also known as the Stanners.

Academics

Archbishop Molloy's academic program is very competitive. A variety of honors classes and thirteen Advanced Placement Program (AP) classes are offered.  Among Catholic schools, Molloy has the highest percentage of its graduates earning Regents diplomas.  The U.S. Department of Education recognized the school as a "National School of Excellence."  Molloy was named as 1 of 96 most "Outstanding American High School" by U.S. News & World Report in 1999, as well as an "Exemplary School" by the United States Department of Education. 100% of Molloy's graduates attend college. Admission is based on the entrance examination and a review of 6th, 7th, and early 8th grade records.

Athletics
Molloy is known for its successful sports program, particularly in basketball, baseball, soccer, and track and field. Its basketball and baseball teams were coached by Jack Curran, the winningest coach in New York City and New York state history in both sports, until his death on March 14, 2013. His replacement was announced as Mike McCleary. After taking over as coach for Lou Carnesecca in 1958, Curran led Molloy basketball to over 870 wins and five city titles. He also produced six NBA players. Curran also coached Molloy's baseball team since 1958, leading them to more than 1,300 wins and 17 CHSAA titles. In 1966, Curran coached Molloy baseball to win 68 consecutive games, a national record which would stand until April 2, 2005. Curran is the only coach to be named National Coach of the Year in two different sports: basketball in 1990 and 2009 and baseball in 1988. He was named CHSAA Coach of the Year 25 times in baseball, 22 times in basketball, won city championships in three different decades and has been elected into seven different Hall of Fames, including the New York City Basketball Hall of Fame.

Molloy's track team has won 24 CHSAA indoor track titles since its inception. Tom Farrell, a Molloy graduate, won a bronze medal at the 1968 Olympics in the 800 m run. Chris Lopez (1991) currently has the New York High School indoor state record in the triple jump, set on March 2, 1991, with a mark of 50′ 7.25″. Molloy's dominant track and field program has more CHSAA team titles than any other CHSAA school.

Molloy's soccer team was undefeated in the 2004 season and won its second state championship that season.

Notable alumni

Xavier Rescigno (1930) - Former Major League Baseball player
Edward D. Head (1936) - 11th Bishop of Buffalo
Lou Carnesecca (1943) - St. John's University coach in College Basketball Hall of Fame
Charles J. Hynes (1952) - Brooklyn District Attorney
Tommy Kearns (1954) - Former NBA player
York Larese (1956) - Former NBA player
Raymond Kelly (1959) - Former New York City Police Commissioner
Peter Vecsey (1961) - Sports columnist and television analyst
Tom Farrell (1962) - Bronze medalist, 800 metres, 1968 Summer Olympics
Louis Willett (1963) - War hero and Medal of Honor recipient
Jim Larrañaga (1967) - Men's basketball coach at University of Miami
Kevin Joyce (1969) - NBA player and captain of 1972 USA Olympic Basketball Team
Charles Camarda (1970) - Astronaut, NASA space shuttle Discovery
Vincent DeVeau (1970) - Writer and editor
John Faso (1970) - Politician, Congressman, Republican nominee for Governor of New York in 2006 
Brian Winters (1970) - Former NBA All-Star and coach
Vitas Gerulaitis (1971) - Former Professional tennis player
David Caruso (1974) - Film and television actor
Frank DiPascali (1974) - Former CFO of Bernard L. Madoff Investment Securities
John Sabini (1974) - Chairman of NY Racing and Wagering Board, former State Senator and NYC Councilman
Andrew Cuomo (1975) - Governor of New York from 2011 to 2021, former Secretary of Housing and Urban Development
Ray Romano (1975) - Actor and comedian (transferred before graduating)
Christopher G. McCann (1979) - president and CEO of 1-800-Flowers
Mike Miller (1979) - New York State Assemblyman
Johannes Knoops (1980) - Rome Prize Fellow in Architecture
Joseph Addabbo, Jr. (1982) - New York State Senator
Tom Westman (1982) - Winner of Survivor: Palau
Kenny Smith (1983) -  Two-time NBA champion, television analyst for NBA on TNT
Brian McNamee (1985) - Former strength and conditioning coach for New York Yankees and Toronto Blue Jays
Christopher Klucsarits (1988) - Professional wrestler
Robert Werdann (1988) - NBA player
Michael Grimm (1988) - Congressman
Kenny Anderson (1989) - Former NBA player
Kerry Keating (1989) - Former basketball head coach, Santa Clara University; former assistant for UCLA and Seton Hall
David Cancel (1990) - Entrepreneur
Mike Jerzembeck (1990) - Former MLB player, New York Yankees
Brian Scolaro (1991) - Comedian and actor
Parry Shen (1991) - Actor
Donn Swaby (?) - Actor
Dan Bongino (1993) - Conservative political commentator former congressional candidate
Brian Benjamin (1994) - Former lieutenant governor of New York 
Kawan Lovelace (1994) - Former Olympian Triple Jumper, 1996 Summer Olympics
Vincent Piazza (1994) - Actor, Boardwalk Empire, Jersey Boys
Mike Baxter (2002) - Former MLB player, New York Mets
Chris Distefano (2002) - Comedian
Gilberto Valle (2002) - Former NYPD officer convicted, then overturned, of conspiracy to kidnap
Sundiata Gaines (2004) - Former NBA player, New Jersey Nets
Matt Rizzotti (2004) - Former Minor League Baseball player
Rosalyn Gold-Onwude (2005) - Basketball analyst
William Morrissey (2005) - Professional wrestler
Russ Smith (2009) - Former NBA player, currently the Israeli Basketball Premier League
Moses Brown (2018) - NBA player

References

External links

 

Educational institutions established in 1892
1892 establishments in New York (state)
Marist Brothers schools
Kew Gardens, Queens
Roman Catholic high schools in Queens, New York